Stoki is a part of the Szczecin City, Poland situated on the left bank of Oder river, north of the Szczecin Old Town and Middle Town amidst large forests and waters of the Cedynia Landscape park.

Stoki